Ruma is a town and municipality in the Srem District of the Autonomous Province of Vojvodina, Serbia. As of 2011, the town has a population of 30,076, while the municipality has a population of 54,339.

History
Traces of organized human life on the territory of Ruma municipality date back as far as prehistory. The most important archaeological locality in the municipality is Bronze Age Gomolava near Hrtkovci, with two exclusive tombs of Bosut culture dating to the 9th century BC and 3000BC Vučedol culture pottery. The first known inhabitants of this area were various peoples of Illyrian and Celtic origin, such as the Amantini, Breuci, Scordisci, etc. During the Roman rule, local inhabitants lost their ethnic character and adopted Roman culture. There were no larger Roman settlements on the territory of Ruma, but a certain number of agricultural estates known as "villae rusticae" were located there.

Migrations of Huns, Germanic peoples, Avars and Slavs destroyed Roman culture in this area. During the following centuries, the region was ruled by Frankish Empire, Bulgarian Empire, Byzantine Empire and Kingdom of Hungary.

The settlement named Ruma was first mentioned in an Ottoman defter from 1566/7. In that period Ruma was a village inhabited by Serbs, with 49 houses, a church and three priests.

From 1718, Ruma was under administration of the Habsburg monarchy. In 1746, the town of Ruma was founded near the original village of Ruma. The first inhabitants of the town were Serbs, who came from neighboring settlements, as well as Germans, who came from Germany. In the beginning of the 19th century, Croats and Hungarians settled there as well. In 1807, a large rebellion of the Syrmian peasants known as the Tican's Rebellion started on the territory of Ruma, with its center in the village of Voganj. During the 1848-1849 revolution, Ruma was one of the important centers of the Serbian national movement in Syrmia.

In the late 19th and early 20th century, Ruma was a district capital in the Syrmia County of the Kingdom of Croatia-Slavonia. According to the 1910 census, the population of the Ruma municipality was 49,138 inhabitants, of whom 22,956 spoke Serbian, 15,529 German, 5,746 Hungarian, and 3,730 Croatian.

After the collapse of the Habsburg Monarchy, on November 24, 1918, the Assembly of Syrmia in Ruma proclaimed the unification of Syrmia with the Kingdom of Serbia. In 1933, Ruma officially gained the status of a city.

When World War II began, Ruma was one of the centers of German national minority in Vojvodina. In 1942, during the Axis occupation of Syrmia, a unit of the Third Reich's Wehrmacht, known as the Volunteer Company Ruma ES der DM, was formed from local Volksdeutsche volunteers. A large number of non-German citizens of Ruma participated in the anti-fascist struggle against Axis occupation. In 1944, as a consequence of the war, most members of the German ethnic minority left the town, escaping from Yugoslav partisans and Soviet Red Army. Around 1,000 of them remained when the partisans took the town. Many of them were shot in November 1944, while survivors were taken to the Svilara concentration camp in Sremska Mitrovica.
 
After the war, colonists from various parts of the former Yugoslavia settled this area. During the 1990s, about 10,000 refugees from Croatia, Bosnia and Kosovo settled in Ruma as well. In 1949 the Union of Pilots of Yugoslavia (Vazduhoplovni Savez Jugoslavije) opened  a pilot school, a school for parachute instructors and a school of aircraft modelling in Ruma, all of which were funded by the Airforces of Yugoslavia. This led to an impressive International air show held in the center of the town in 1950.

Inhabited places

The Ruma municipality comprises the town of Ruma and the following villages:

Buđanovci
Vitojevci
Voganj
Grabovci
Dobrinci
Donji Petrovci
Žarkovac
Klenak
Kraljevci
Mali Radinci
Nikinci
Pavlovci
Platičevo
Putinci
Stejanovci
Hrtkovci

Demographics

According to the 2011 census results, the municipality of Ruma has 54,339 inhabitants.

Ethnic groups
The municipality of Ruma has many ethnic groups, with Serbs constituting a majority in all settlements. The ethnic composition of the municipality of Ruma:

Economy
The following table gives a preview of total number of registered people employed in legal entities per their core activity (as of 2018):

Notable citizens
Aleksandar Berček, actor
Miloš Bosančić, Serbian footballer
Brana Crnčević, writer
Stanija Dobrojević, glamour model and TV personality
Teodor Filipović (Boža Grujović), first secretary of "Praviteljstvujušči sovjet" in Karađorđe's Serbia
Stjepko Gut, jazz musician
Paško Rakić, neuroscientist
Atanasije Stojković, scientist and writer
Dragan Šarac, former Serbian footballer
Alois Weiss, executioner
Rajka Vali, singer
Danilo Pantić, Serbian football player
Vjekoslav Servatzy, Croatian Ustaše military officer, war criminal

Sister cities
  Arzamas, Russia
  Bersenbrück, Germany

Image gallery

See also
 List of cities in Serbia
 List of cities, towns and villages in Vojvodina
 Syrmia
 Syrmia District

References

External links

 Ruma Official website

 
Populated places in Srem District
Municipalities and cities of Vojvodina
Towns in Serbia